Darbara Singh was an Indian politician, chief minister of Punjab, India. 

Darbara Singh may also refer to:

Darbara Singh (murderer), Indian serial killer
Darbara Singh (speaker), Indian politician
Darbara Singh Guru, Indian politician
Baba Darbara Singh, Jathedar